The Hoboken Chicken Emergency is a 1977 children's book by Daniel and Jill Pinkwater. The book may have been inspired by the Jersey Giant breed of chicken.

Plot summary
The main character, Arthur, is asked to pick up a reserved turkey for Thanksgiving dinner, but the market has lost the reservation, and no store in the area has any turkeys or other birds available for purchase. So Arthur finds and brings home a 266-pound chicken named Henrietta. The family welcomes her with open arms, but the neighbors are not so sure. Everyone in town is horrified after Henrietta escapes.

In other media 
The Hoboken Chicken Emergency was adapted into a television movie in 1984. It was adapted into a play by Chad Henry in 1988.

See also

References

1977 American novels
1977 children's books
American children's novels
American novels adapted into films
Children's novels about animals
Hoboken, New Jersey
Novels set in New Jersey
Prentice Hall books